Poor Alex Theatre was a theatre company based in Toronto, Ontario, Canada.

The Poor Alex opened in Toronto's Annex neighbourhood in the 1960s in a property owned by Ed Mirvish and took its name as a parody of the Mirvish-owned Royal Alexandra Theatre. A small theatre venue, it hosted a comedy and off Broadway-style productions and was the original home of the "Jest Society", which later became famous as the Royal Canadian Air Farce.

In 1996, Valerie Morgan (executive producer) took over the theatre began renovations and equipment upgrades. She publicized the theatre's historical past and its future goals. The Poor Alex Theatre began the Cabaret, welcoming nightly or weekend performances. It became a place to house all types of events.

The location at Brunswick and Bloor was sold in August 2005, and The Poor Alex Theatre relocated to 772A Dundas St. W. one block west of Bathurst St. The new venue space with 200 seating capacity has been designed for multi-tasking any type of event and rigged with full lighting and audio capabilities for a professionally staged performance.

The Poor Alex closed and the venue is now home to the Green Room.

Notable acts
 1966: The Tickle Trunk, starring Mr. Dressup with Casey and Finnegan

References

External links
 Poor Alex Theatre

Theatres in Toronto